Walter Robert Smith (7 May 1872 – 25 February 1942) was a Labour Member of Parliament (MP) who represented Wellingborough and Norwich. He was an organiser with the National Union of Boot and Shoe Operatives.

Early career
Smith was president of the Norwich Union of Clickers and Roughstuff Cutters in 1893, and when that organisation was merged in the National Union of Boot and Shoe Operatives in 1894, Smith became the part-time president of the Norwich branch, a position he held until his election as national organiser in 1916. He was member of Norwich City Council and honorary president of the National Union of Agricultural Workers from 1911 to 1923.  He also served as president of Norwich Trades Council from 1904 until 1917, and was the first president of the International Landworkers' Federation.

Political career
Smith was the first Labour MP who was elected for Wellingborough. He represented the division from 1918 to 1922. He represented his native city of Norwich in between 1923 and 1924, and again in from 1929 to 1931. In 1924 he was Parliamentary Secretary to the Board of Agriculture and Fisheries in the First MacDonald ministry. The next year he replaced John Stirling-Maxwell as member of the Forestry Commission. In the Second MacDonald ministry Smith was Parliamentary Secretary to the Board of Trade (1929–31). He was chairman of the Labour Party in 1934, and the following year Smith was announced as a member of the newly created Herring Industry Board.

References

External links 
 

1872 births
1942 deaths
UK MPs 1918–1922
UK MPs 1923–1924
UK MPs 1929–1931
Labour Party (UK) MPs for English constituencies
National Union of Boot and Shoe Operatives-sponsored MPs
Presidents of the National Union of Agricultural and Allied Workers
People from Wellingborough
Politicians from Norwich
Place of birth missing
Chairs of the Labour Party (UK)
Parliamentary Secretaries to the Board of Trade